Azad Qaraqoyunlu (also, Azadkarakoyunlu) is a town and municipality in the Tartar Rayon of Azerbaijan.  It has a population of 2,487.  The municipality consists of the villages of Azad Qaraqoyunlu, Aşağı Qapanlı, and İlxıçılar.

Notable natives 

 Behbud Khan Javanshir — Minister of Internal Affairs of the Azerbaijan Democratic Republic (1918).

References 

Populated places in Tartar District